Marcantonio Dordi (1598 - 23 October 1663) was an Italian painter, active in Bassano del Grappa.

He was a pupil of Giacomo Appollonio, and later followed the style of painters of the Bassano family. His daughter married a painter Giovanni Goffre, originally of Liege, who trained under Marcantonio.

References

1598 births
1663 deaths
17th-century Italian painters
Italian male painters
Italian Baroque painters